The following are the records of Moldova in Olympic weightlifting. Records are maintained in each weight class for the snatch lift, clean and jerk lift, and the total for both lifts by the Weightlifting Federation of Republic of Moldova.

Current records

Men

Women

Historical records

Men (1998–2018)

Women (1998–2018)

References

External links

records
Moldova
Olympic weightlifting
weightlifting